Świercze railway station is a railway station in Jackowo Dworskie, Nasielsk, Nowy Dwór, Masovian, Poland. It is served by Koleje Mazowieckie.

References
Station article at kolej.one.pl

External links

Railway stations in Warsaw